Il Caffè was an Italian enlightenment publication in Milan in the period 1764–1766. The other publication with the same title is as follows:

 Il Caffè (magazine), Italian anti-Fascist magazine existed between 1924 and 1925 in Milan

See also

 :Category:Disambiguation pages